The Fourth Legislative Assembly of Delhi was constituted in October 2008 after the 2008 Delhi Legislative Assembly elections.

Election and government formation

In all, 7 national parties, 8 state parties, 53 registered (unrecognised) parties and other independent candidates contested for the 70 assembly seats of the Assembly.

With 43 seats, INC emerged as the single largest party, much ahead of the required half way mark to form the government. Congress was followed by BJP with 23 seats. Being the single largest party, INC approached the Lieutenant Governor of Delhi Tejendra Khanna and made claim to form a government. INC hence formed the government with Sheila Dikshit as the Chief Minister.

Electors

Candidates

Important members

List of members
Default sort, in ascending order of constituency.

References 

Indian politics articles by importance
Delhi Legislative Assembly